Rukutu (Quechua for rukutu, ruqutu a plant (Capsicum pubescens), hispanicized spelling Rocodo) is a mountain in the Cordillera Central in the Andes of Peru, about  high. It is situated in the Lima Region, Huarochirí Province, on the border of the districts of Huarochirí and San Damian. It lies south of Suyruqucha and Suqlla, and northeast of Wamanripa.

References 

Mountains of Peru
Mountains of Lima Region